Metajana is a genus of moths in the family Lasiocampidae. The genus was first described by William Jacob Holland in 1896.

Species
Metajana chanleri Holland, 1896
Metajana hypolispa Tams, 1930
Metajana marshalli (Aurivillius, 1909)

References

Lasiocampidae